Zürich Triemli is a railway station in the west of the Swiss city of Zürich, in the city's Friesenberg quarter. The station is on the Uetliberg line, which is operated by the Sihltal Zürich Uetliberg Bahn (SZU).

The station is served by the following passenger trains:

Situated on a single track line, the station had a passing loop and two platforms, prior to renovation of the station. Besides being served by through trains between Zürich HB and Uetliberg railway stations, Triemli is also the terminus of a more frequent suburban shuttle service from Zurich HB.

The station is adjacent to the Triemli Hospital, one of Zürich's main hospitals, and there is direct access from the station platform to the hospital site. A level crossing carries Hohensteinweg across the line immediately to the west of the station.

Gallery

References

External links

Triemli